Events in the year 2022 in Monaco.

Incumbents 
 Monarch: Albert II
 Minister of State (Monaco): Pierre Dartout

Events 
Ongoing – COVID-19 pandemic in Monaco

 28 February – Despite having strong connections with Russian oligarchs, the nation announced the adoption of sanctions against Russia in line with current EU sanctions.
 22 July – The first case of Monkeypox was reported in the nation.

Deaths

See also 
 COVID-19 pandemic in Europe
 City states

References 

 
2020s in Monaco
Years of the 21st century in Monaco
Monaco
Monaco